The 2021 Munster Senior Football Championship was the 2021 installment of the annual Munster Senior Football Championship organised by the Munster GAA. Kerry won the tournament beating Cork in the final.

Teams
The Munster championship is contested by all six counties in the Irish province of Munster.

Bracket

Quarter-finals
The four non-finalists from the 2020 championship entered this round. The lowest ranked county to play in the quarter-finals was Waterford of Division 4.

Summary

Matches

Semi-finals
The finalists from the 2020 championship entered this round along with the two quarter-final winners. The lowest ranked counties to play in the quarter-finals were Limerick and Tipperary of Division 3.

Summary

Matches

Final

Kerry qualified for the 2021 All-Ireland SFC semi-finals.

Notes

References

2M
Munster Senior Football Championship